Rohan Gajjar (born 8 May 1984) is an Indian former professional tennis player.

Gajjar, who comes from Mumbai, played collegiate tennis for the University of Arkansas between 2003 and 2006, while studying for a degree in marketing. He was named in the 2005 All-SEC first-team. 

Following his collegiate career he competed on the professional tour and in 2007 made an ATP Tour doubles main draw appearance in his home tournament, the Kingfisher Airlines Tennis Open. In 2010 he reached his career best singles ranking of 429 and broke through that year for his first ITF Futures singles title in Malaysia. At Futures level he was most successful in doubles, winning 13 titles over the course of his career.

ITF Futures titles

Singles: (2)

Doubles: (13)

References

External links
 
 

1984 births
Living people
Indian male tennis players
Racket sportspeople from Mumbai
Arkansas Razorbacks men's tennis players